Lukáš Endl (born 17 June 2003) is a Czech footballer who currently plays as a centre back for FC Zbrojovka Brno.

Club career

FC Zbrojovka Brno
He made his professional debut for Zbrojovka Brno in the away match against Varnsdorf on 24 June 2020, which ended in a win 1:0.

References

External links
 Profile at FC Zbrojovka Brno official site
 Profile at FAČR official site

2003 births
Living people
Czech footballers
FC Zbrojovka Brno players
Association football midfielders
Czech National Football League players
Czech Republic youth international footballers
Footballers from Brno